Gary Jules is the 2006 third studio album by American singer-songwriter Gary Jules.

Track listing

2006 albums
Gary Jules albums